Jangchung-dong is a dong, neighbourhood of Jung-gu in Seoul, South Korea.

Attractions
 National Theater of Korea
 Jangchung Gymnasium
 Grand Ambassador Seoul hotel
 Jangchung (장충단 奬忠壇)
  (장충단공원 奬忠壇公園)
 The Advisory on Democratic Peaceful Unification (민주평화통일자문회의 民主平和統一諮問會議)
 Korea Freedom League (한국자유총연맹 韓國自由總聯盟)
 Freedom Center (자유센터), building for Korea Freedom League
 Kyungdong Presbyterian Church (경동교회)
 Banyan Tree Club and Spa (반얀트리 클럽&스파)
 Shilla Hotel

Transportation 
 Dongguk University Station of

See also 
Administrative divisions of South Korea

References

External links
 Jangchungdong Jokbal Street 
 Jung-gu Official site in English
 Jung-gu Official site
 Jung-gu Tour Guide from the Official site
 Status quo of Jung-gu 
 Resident offices and maps of Jung-gu 
 Jangchung-dong resident office website 
 Kyungdong Presbyterian Church 

Neighbourhoods of Jung-gu, Seoul